Homaabad-e Olya (also Romanized as Homāābād-e ‘Olyā; also known as Hamābād-e ‘Olyā, Hamamābād, Homāābād-e Bālā, Homābād-e Bālā, Homābād-e ‘Olyā, Homabad Olya, and Humābād Bāla) is a village in Lay Siyah Rural District, in the Central District of Nain County, Isfahan Province, Iran. At the 2006 census, its population was 239, in 78 families.

References 

Populated places in Nain County